Sistranda is the administrative centre of the municipality of Frøya in Trøndelag county, Norway.

Sistranda has schools representing all levels up to high school. It is also the centre of transportation on the island of Frøya, with buses to locations around the region and ferries with daily routes to Trondheim, Mausund, Sula, and Froan.

Name
The first element is the name of an old farm. The name of the farm is identical with the word síða which means "side" (here in the sense of the "coast"). The farm is today divided in three parts: Yttersian (Outer-Sian), Midtsian (Middle-Sian) and Innersian (Inner-Sian). The last element is the finite form of strand.

References

Villages in Trøndelag
Frøya, Trøndelag